Harrison Jones (born 25 February 2001) is an Australian rules footballer who plays for  in the Australian Football League (AFL).

Early football
Jones played junior football with the Gisborne Rookies in the Riddell District Football League. He attended Salesian College (Rupertswood) before moving to Penleigh and Essendon Grammar School, where he played football for the school. His school football coach likened him to  great Nick Riewoldt due to his 'enormous work-rate'. Jones played for the Calder Cannons in the NAB League, where he played predominantly as a ruck. Over his two seasons with the Cannons, he played 15 games, averaged 9.3 hitouts and 12.8 disposals. He also played for Vic Metro in the 2019 AFL Under 18 Championships, where he kicked 4 goals from 4 games, and averaged 9.3 disposals.

AFL career
Jones debuted in the opening round of the 2021 AFL season, but his season ended with a toe injury that required surgery On debut, Jones collected 13 disposals and 3 behinds. In round 14 against Hawthorn, Jones was nominated for Rising Star kicking 2 goals and 1 behind, 14 touches and 8 marks. The following week, Jones got nominated for Goal of the year against Melbourne. Jones played 16 out of the possible 22 games in 2021. Jones played his first game in Round 11 in 2022. He scored 1 goal and had 8 disposals.

Statistics
 Statistics are correct to the end of round 9, 2021.

|- style="background-color: #EAEAEA"
! scope="row" style="text-align:center" | 2020
|style="text-align:center;"|
| 23 || 0 || — || — || — || — || — || — || — || — || — || — || — || — || — || —
|- 
! scope="row" style="text-align:center" | 2021
|
| 23 || 9 || 10 || 4 || 46 || 23 || 69 || 33 || 15 || 1.1 || 0.4 || 5.1 || 2.6 || 7.7 || 3.7 || 1.7
|- class="sortbottom"
! colspan=3| Career
! 4 
! 3 
! 3 
! 31 
! 26 
! 57 
! 17 
! 10 
! 1.1
! 0.4 
! 5.1 
! 2.6 
! 7.7 
! 3.7 
! 1.7
|}

References

2001 births
Living people
Essendon Football Club players
Calder Cannons players
Australian rules footballers from Victoria (Australia)
People educated at Salesian College (Rupertswood)
People educated at Penleigh and Essendon Grammar School